Tufara is a comune (municipality) in the Province of Campobasso in the Italian region Molise, located about  southeast of Campobasso.

Tufara borders the following municipalities: Castelvetere in Val Fortore, Celenza Valfortore, Gambatesa, Riccia, San Bartolomeo in Galdo, San Marco la Catola.

References

External links

 

Cities and towns in Molise